Cucuí is a Brazilian district within the municipality of São Gabriel da Cachoeira, on the border with the Amazonas state of Venezuela (within the municipality of Río Negro Municipality) and the Guainía department of Colombia (within the municipality of San Felipe). The district is located slightly east of the Rio Negro, which flows through the Brazil–Colombia–Venezuela tripoint and forms the border between Colombia and Venezuela. The district serves as a checkpoint and crossing point for the Brazil–Venezuela and for the Brazil–Colombia borders.

References 

Populated places in Amazonas (Brazilian state)
Populated places on the Rio Negro (Amazon)
Brazil–Venezuela border crossings
Brazil–Colombia border crossings